Abdel-Aziz Mehelba (born 10 December 1988) is an Egyptian sports shooter. He competed in the men's trap event at the 2016 Summer Olympics. He was eliminated in the qualification round in which he came in 24th. He also competed at the 2020 Summer Olympics in the men's trap event and the trap mixed team event.

References

External links
 

1988 births
Living people
Egyptian male sport shooters
Olympic shooters of Egypt
Shooters at the 2016 Summer Olympics
Place of birth missing (living people)
Shooters at the 2020 Summer Olympics